Wojciech Klata (born 27 January 1976) is a Polish actor. He starred in the opening episode of the Dekalog series directed by Krzysztof Kieślowski. He has appeared in nearly 20 films and television shows since 1988. In 1993, he played the role of Lisiek in the Steven Spielberg directed historical drama ''Schindler's List.

Filmography

References

External links

1976 births
Living people
Male actors from Warsaw
Polish male film actors
Polish male television actors
Polish male child actors
20th-century Polish male actors
21st-century Polish male actors